Hans Ammann (3 March 1931 – 1980) was a Swiss cross-country skier. He competed in the men's 15 kilometre event at the 1964 Winter Olympics.
He was flagbearers for Switzerland at the Opening Ceremony of 1964 Winter Olympics.

References

External links
 

1931 births
1980 deaths
Swiss male cross-country skiers
Olympic cross-country skiers of Switzerland
Cross-country skiers at the 1964 Winter Olympics
Sportspeople from the canton of St. Gallen